VUP may refer to:
 Alfonso López Pumarejo Airport, also known as Valledupar Airport, IATA code VUP
 Instructions per second, as "VAX Unit of Performance"
 The viewer/user/player role in transmedia storytelling, a communication technique